Lucero Hogaza León (born 29 August 1969) is a Mexican singer and entertainer. She is a multi-platinum singer in Mexico and has sung in Spanish, English, and Portuguese. Lucero has sold more than  30 million records worldwide.

As a child she starred in the popular Mexican children shows Alegrias de Mediodia and Chispita. She went on to release a series of successful albums. Some of her songs peaked on top of most of the Latin charts including the Billboard charts in the USA.
She received her first leading role in the film Coqueta and went on to film a total of seven movies. Lucero starred in the leading role of nine Mexican telenovelas and has won more TVyNovelas Awards than any other actress.
Lucero has been the hostess of the Latin Grammy Awards on eight occasions, and has been the face of the fundraising show Teletón Mexico.

Early life and career

1980s

Lucero is the daughter of Lucero León and Antonio Hogaza.

Her career began in 1980. When she was young, she had concerns about being an artist, but at aged 10 Televisa offered her the opportunity to appear in a juvenile theme program named Alegrías De Mediodía (Midday Happiness), next to several children and young talents in music and comedy, like Aida Pierce and Aleks Syntek.

She combined work with academic studies, also taking singing and dancing lessons. At that time she also performed in the program Juguemos a Cantar (Let's play to sing), in which she was the interpreter of the theme. Following these opportunities, she received several offers in different programs, among them Chiquilladas (Childishness), making her first starring appearance in the series for children, where one of her more popular roles was in a Popeye skit as Olive Oyl.

In 1982, she starred her first telenovela, Chispita ("Little Spark"), alternating with great actors such as Enrique Lizalde, Angélica Aragón, among others. Her acting brought her 2 awards, her first TVyNovelas Award and Azteca de Oro Award. From that moment her career was seen as a promising future; curiously enough with the emergence of Lucero as a singer, she did not record the theme song for this telenovela. Instead that task was given to Timbiriche, the most popular juvenile group in Mexico. This is how Raúl Velasco invited her to conduct and interpret the main theme of the musical pageant América, Esta Es Tu Canción. In 1982, she released her first album, with Musart Records, Te Prometo (I promise you).

The following year, 1985, she was contacted to perform in her third film Fiebre de amor (Eng: Love Fever) along with one of the most sought-after male singer of the decade, Luis Miguel. This combination was a complete success with the audience and the film received two Diosa de la Plata Awards, including Breakthrough Performance for Lucerito.

She participated in the soundtrack with two songs, and due to the favourable outcome of the film, the soundtrack also had a special edition for Italy. In this same year, at the suggestion of her mother, Lucerito left her mentor from the first two albums, Sergio Andrade, as the gossip began to grow that he had fallen in love with her. To avoid problems, the music company decided to release another album, but this time without the guidance of Sergio Andrade. Instead she was provided with different producers and composers, among them Joan Sebastian and Jaime Sánchez Rosaldo.

In 1986, she recorded Un Pedacito De Mí (Eng: A little piece of me), her fourth and last album with Musart Records. In order to get away from the shadow of Sergio Andrade's management, she signed to Melody Records the same year. Due to the departure of the singer to another company, Musart did not promote this album, which resulted with sales lower than her previous albums. Her single "Era la primera vez" (Eng: It was the first time), was a hit in Mexican charts reaching the top 10 and the top 20 in Billboard. In 1986, she was also cast in her first theatre role, in the play Don Juan Tenorio, playing Doña Inés de Ulloa.

Ending the decade, she established herself as one of the best singers in Latin America and the United States. She continued her ascent in her career, now releasing her sixth studio album Cuéntame. The sales of the album reached gold and platinum status in Mexico. This album opened the U.S. market, Spain, also across borders in Central America, in countries like Guatemala, Costa Rica, Honduras, Panama and all South America. The title single achieved great success, becoming a number 1 hit in Mexico, Costa Rica, Colombia, Guatemala among other countries. The same song was included in VH1 list "Best 100 Songs of the '80s in Spanish".

This disc was the last album she released under the name Lucerito. During this year, Procter & Gamble saw in Lucero one of the most famous and best cared-for hair styles and hired her to be the central image of the Head & Shoulders shampoo campaign for Latin America.

1990s – from Rancheras to Piel de Ángel

Lucero left the 1980s with a solid career in which she was recognized as one of the best singers of the decade. In 1990, Lucero starred in her first telenovela as an adult Cuando llega el amor where she also sang the theme song. This telenovela earned her the TVyNovelas Award for Best Actress. Melody Records released a special EP called Cuando llega el Amor, a huge hit in Latin America reaching the top five in several countries. In the same year, after conquering the youth market with a ballad, Lucero opened a new facet in her career with ranchero genre performing cover versions of the hits of the famous band, Los Bukis, in her album Con Mi Sentimiento, produced by the composer Rubén Fuentes.

Her performances abroad earned her as a strong reputation as a Mexican singer in Latin America, Spain and the United States, giving her also the nickname of Lucero de México and La Novia de América (The Bride of America). She appeared in her sixth film, Deliciosa Sinvergüenza (Delicious rascal).

In 1991, she released Sólo Pienso En Ti which achieved gold and platinum status in Argentina, Chile and Mexico. Five singles were released becoming big hits in Billboard, Mexico, Spain and Latin America. The first single was "Electricidad" ("Electricity") which reached the peak position in 10 countries and the top 5 in the USA.

In the same year she received five awards for Best Singer for her work Con mi Sentimiento. In 1992, she was selected as Queen of Viña del Mar Festival in the Viña del Mar International Song Festival. She returned to the ranchera genre with the album Lucero de México, once again produced by Rubén Fuentes. The promotion of the album was big, since her first ranchero album had not been well promoted. Sales achieved the gold status in Central America and Chile. In Mexico, they reached the double platinum, becoming one of the best selling albums of ranchera music.

She was a recipient of the special accolate in the TVyNovelas Awards as Best Legs in the Mexican Media. During the year she was designated the singer with most international projection by the critics. In 1993, Lucero received a nomination for the Lo Nuestro Awards for Female Regional Mexican Artist of the Year.

In 1994, Lucero released another ranchero album, Cariño De Mis Cariños, her third album of this genre and also produced by Rubén Fuentes. The album was selected as one of the best albums of the year according to Eres magazine in Mexico. The album earned the platinum status in that country.

At the end of 1994, she released her album Siempre Contigo, supervised by Rafael Perez Botija. The album achieved gold status in Mexico and high sales in Central America. From the album, five singles were released, reaching the top of the lists: "Siempre contigo" was her only song so far to reach the number one position in the USA. For the Lo Nuestro Awards of 1996, Lucero was nominated for Pop Female Singer and Video of the Year for "Palabras", directed by Fernán Martínez.

In mid-1995, she performed in the soap opera Lazos de Amor in which she played triplets. The telenovela topped the TV ratings and she also received several awards among them TVyNovelas, El Heraldo, Eres, Diosa de Plata, all for best actress. Melody released the soundtrack of the telenovela Lazos de Amor with good sales and good airplay through Latin America and the United States. During 1995, Lucero sang two new songs on a UNICEF album, El Nuevo Sol, to raise funds for children, sharing credits with Pandora and Magneto. Apart from this participation, she made two more special appearances, in the album Boleros:Por amor y desamor and a duet with Mijares on the live album El Encuentro, which received high rotation on radio in U.S. and Latin America, reaching the top ten lists.

In 1997, she returned to the music scene after an extensive tour throughout Latin America and the United States, with the album Piel de Ángel (Eng: Skin of Angel) and after a pause of almost 3 years without releasing any studio album, in this album she is with an interpretive force that subdues a privileged voice that runs at will. In this new album, the hits "Tácticas de Guerra", "Toda La Noche" and "Quiero" made her a favorite of the public and earned her a gold disc and platinum for her high sales in Mexico and the United States.

In 1997, Lucero married the singer Manuel Mijares. They had two children. The wedding was called "the event of the year" and it was broadcast through Televisa to Latin America. The ceremony was held in the chapel of San Ignacio de Loyola Vizcaínas High School.

In October 1997, she was invited to sing to the Pope John Paul II during the II World Meeting of Families in the Maracana stadium in Rio de Janeiro. The opportunity was, in Lucero's own words, the most emotional experience of her spiritual life and professional.

In December 1997, she captivated the Mexican public and other countries to lead the Telethon in Mexico for 27 hours non-stop to raise money for care and rehabilitation centers for disabled people. She has led the Telethon year after year to date, being the hostess of the event. From 1997, Radio Móvil Dipsa used Lucero as the new image for its mobile campaign with Telcel. She made television spots promoting rates, coverage, cellular models and wireless internet. Sales increased and her contract was renewed until 2000.

She received the Billboard Music Award for Best Ranchera Album. Also during this year, she collaborated in the soundtrack of Mulan, nominated for the Best Original Musical or Comedy Score Oscar, singing the song "Reflejo". In this production she shared credits with Cristian Castro and Christina Aguilera. At the end of the 1990s, the event Un Lucero En La México took place in the Plaza de Toros Mexico bringing together more than 40,000 people who chanted Lucero's hits and gathered to celebrate her 20th anniversary as a singer and actress, in a concert of nearly three hours. She recorded her first live album that sold more than 200,000 copies.

During 1999, she participated in the dubbing of the Walt Disney Pictures movie Tarzan, performing the voice of Jane Porter. Also in 1999, Banamex (Mexico's largest bank) chose Lucero to be the main image of the TV spot of its 100 years of existence, for Mexico only.

2000s – from Mi Destino to second live album

The new millennium started with new contracts to Lucero. In early 2000, Lucero and singer Chayanne were employed by PepsiCo to promote Doritos and Pepsi products. They did together a TV spot and several ads that were promoted throughout the Latino community in the United States. Also during this year, AT&T signed a contract with Lucero to be the main face to offer special rates for long-distance calls to Latino families in the United States, where she sang in several spots the number of the area code. In 2002 and 2003, the contract remained in force, so the company had printed some ads with her image that were published throughout the United States, and for private concerts.

In 2000, she recorded the album Mi destino (Eng: My Destiny) for the company Sony Music International, with this album Lucero shows a wide range of rhythms and sounds as the disc is produced by three world-renowned producers, Rafael Perez Botija who has produced figures as José José and Rocío Dúrcal to name a few, Ric Wake who has worked with Mariah Carey and Celine Dion among others, and Jimmy Greco who has also produced great figures like Coco Lee and Jennifer Lopez, so she surprises with 2 songs in English with an outstanding quality and interpretation. She starred in the telenovela Mi Destino Eres Tú (Eng: My destiny is you), production again under Carla Estrada and with a multistellar cast like Jacqueline Andere, Silvia Pasquel, Julio Alemán, and María Sorté among others. Again making position in the highest ratings worldwide. This performance earned her an award as Best Lead Actress in a telenovela.

In 2001, she made a special appearance in the concert of Mijares for his second live album. Besides she received in Chile's Viña del Mar International Song Festival the award Silver Seagull granted by the public as favorite singer.

In February 2002, she began promoting the album Un Nuevo Amor (Eng: A new love), a ranchera cutting production under the supervision of three major producers such as Rubén Fuentes, Estéfano Salgado and Homero Patrón, which achieves high sales in Mexico and abroad. This album was the first for Sony Music in ranchera music, besides it was the returning of Lucero to the studios after her first pregnancy. For the time being, she was sought to participate in 3 studio album Huey Dunbar's, Gabriel Navarro's and a special tribute to Selena. In the month of June of this year, Lucero received the Double Eagle Leadership Award from the Chamber of Commerce of Mexico & United States in gala celebrated in Coral Gables, Florida for her commitment to build stronger relations between the United States and Mexico, presented by the TV host Don Francisco.

In early 2003, Lucero was invited by PepsiCo to be the main image of the new product Sabritas for Mexico. With only three TV spots and ads the company managed to sell more than expected, so Lucero was recognized with an award and was invited to be the image of the 60 anniversary of Sabritas, singing the official jingle A Que No Puedes Comer Sólo Una (You can't eat just one).

Throughout 2003, she starred in the musical adaptation of the book by Antonio Velasco Piña, a musical that tells another version of what happened on 2 October 1968, in Tlatelolco. Lucero decided to take this play since she rejected to participate in the telenovela Amor real. Several months in theaters made her win an award for best actress in a musical and offered 100 performances with 100 standing ovations from the audience. Critics and reporters who were reportedly hostile to the actress created a situation whereby, when the plaque for the 100th performance was shown, television reporters insisted on having an interview with the actress and tried to follow her, only to have a security guard draw his gun against them. She defended the acts of her guard which led to her being removed from hosting the annual Telethon for several years.

In August 2003, she was back to film sets to perform the role of Esperanza Alcalá in one of the most ambitious projects of Mexican cinema, Zapata: El sueño de un héroe (Eng: Zapata: The dream of a hero) by Alfonso Arau; starring Alejandro Fernández and photography by Vittorio Storaro who has to his credits 3 Oscars, art direction and costumes by Eugenio Zanetti who has also been awarded an Oscar. She participated in the soundtrack of the movie with one song named Quédate en mí (Eng: Stay in me). In the fall of 2003, she signed a contract and start with Fuller Cosmetics to promote her own perfume. An elegant fragrance within a diamond-shaped container that represents exclusivity and style. This perfume has sold many pieces in Mexico that is still available by Fuller Cosmetics.

In 2004, it was released Cuando Sale Un Lucero (Eng: When a star comes out) under the company of EMI Music Mexico, a new ranchera album with the production again of Ruben Fuentes and Homero Patrón; with the singles Entre La Espada y La Pared and Vete Por Donde Llegaste achieved gold record and release a special edition. That same year she returns to telenovelas, now with a relevant part in Alborada (Eng: Dawn) where the story takes place in the 1800s and where she played María Hipólita Díaz alongside Fernando Colunga, Daniela Romo, and more. They achieve top position in the audience.

After her role in this soap opera that lasted until 2005, Lucero began to record her next album in early 2006. She released Quiéreme Tal Como Soy (Eng.: Love Me As I Am) in September 2006, where she pays tribute to Rafael Pérez Botija, the composer and producer of her biggest hits. With this record she achieved strong sales thanks to the singles La Única Que Te Entiende (Eng: The One who understands you) y O Tú O Nada (Eng: Either you or nothing). In November 2006, she hosted for the first time the 7th Latin Grammy ceremony, since then she has participated as a host five times so far. As a result of the good sales of Quiéreme tal como soy, the company decided to make a concert in the National Auditorium in March 2007, recording an album completely live that achieved high sales on CD and DVD formats. This was her second and last live album to be released to the public.

On 20 October 2008, the telenovela Mañana es para siempre (Eng: Tomorrow Is Forever) was released and produced by Nicandro Diaz. This soap opera had a primetime broadcast where Lucero starred Barbara Greco, the villain of the trama; this was her second antagonist role since her well-received character María Paula in Lazos de Amor in 1996. She shared credits alongside great actors such as Silvia Navarro, Fernando Colunga and Sergio Sendel. The ratings were high and reached 51 points in his final chapter with a special two-hour duration. Due to the popularity and credibility, Procter & Gamble invited Lucero to be the face and spokesperson for the line of creams and Olay beauty products. In this way, year after year the cosmetics company has renewed its contract with the actress and singer, even getting the image of Pantene shampoo in 2011.
During mid-2008 there was controversy, the singer Lucero filed a lawsuit against the Universal Music label at not receiving royalties for sales of some of her albums in the last 14 years, albums recorded with Melody Records from Fonovisa, now part of Universal. Melody Records had agreed in 1998 to pay what they owed and never paid off the debt. Lucero and the company reached an undisclosed financial agreement on the debt of the old company.
Enrique Peña Nieto, governor of the State of Mexico in 2008, chooses Lucero to be the official spokesperson of the achievements that his government have met over the months. With the response from people, she renewed the contract to remain the face in 2009. After finishing the contract, she was called to participate in the Spanish version of the album Voces (Eng: Voices) of the Greek composer Yanni, where it was released the single "Eterno Es Este Amor" (Eng: Eternal is this love).

2010s – "Indispensable" for music
The new decade begins with bad news for the world, a calamitous magnitude 7.0 Mw earthquake hit Haiti with an epicenter near the town of Léogâne. The earthquake occurred at 16:53 local time (21:53 UTC) on Tuesday, 12 January 2010. Due to the proximity of the release of the 25th anniversary of the worldwide hit We Are the World, written by Michael Jackson and Lionel Richie, Quincy Jones and Richie decided to release it as We Are the World 25 for Haiti to raise money for the victims. Jones made a determination to promote a Spanish version of the song hiring Emilio Estefan and his wife Gloria Estefan, they arrange it to be sung in Spanish language. Both were responsible for selecting the singers who participated in the new song titled Somos El Mundo 25 Por Haiti; Lucero was called to be part of the song, but at the time she was very busy with a new telenovela and a new album to contribute in a leading part; thus she decided to participate at least in the chorus to help.

She finished filming Soy Tu Dueña a remake of the 1995 telenovela "La Dueña". It was known to be a hit. Critics said she was back on the spotlight. In Soy Tu Dueña she played Valentina Villalba. Along with Fernando Colunga). In October 2010, she released Indispensable, a pop album.

For her work in television and the recording industry, Lucero's hand-prints have been embedded onto the Paseo de las Luminarias in Mexico City.

On 17 January 1997 Lucero married singer Manuel Mijares with whom she had two children, a son José Manuel Mijares (born 12 November 2001) and a daughter Lucero Mijares (born 2 February 2005). On 4 March 2011, after 14 years of marriage, Lucero and Mijares announced their separation. In January 2014, Lucero came under controversy after she posed with her boyfriend Michel Kuri in front of a supposed dead animal following a hunting activity. She released a statement that the picture was leaked from her personal computer. Amid the criticisms, her performance was suspended at the International Festival Viña del Mar 2014 in Chile.

Discography

As Lucero
1990: Con Mi Sentimiento
1991: Sólo Pienso En Tí
1992: Lucero De México
1993: Lucero
1994: Cariño De Mis Cariños
1994: Siempre Contigo
1997: Piel de Ángel
1998: Cerca de Ti
1999: Un Lucero En La México
2000: Mi Destino
2002: Un Nuevo Amor
2004: Cuando Sale Un Lucero
2006: Quiéreme Tal Como Soy
2007: Lucero En Vivo Auditorio Nacional
2010: Indispensable
2011: Mi Secreto de Amor
2012: Un Lu*Jo
2013: Lucero en Concierto
2014: Aqui Estoy
2017: Enamorada Con Banda
2017: 
2018: Más Enamorada con Banda
2018: Enamorada En Vivo
2019: Brasileira En Vivo
2019: Solo Me Faltabas Tu
2020: 20y20

As Lucerito
1982: Te Prometo
1984: Con Tan Pocos Años
1985: Fuego y Ternura
1986: Un Pedacito De Mí
1988: Lucerito
1989: Cuéntame

Special albums and EPs

As Lucero
1990: Cuando llega el Amor
1995: Lazos de Amor
1997: Lucero le canta a la Virgen
1998: Mulán
2003: Regina
2004: Zapata
2013: Lucero en Concierto

As Lucerito
1982: Juguemos a Cantar
1982: Los Chiquillos de la TV
1982: 20 Navidéxitos
1982: América, Esta Es Tu Canción
1984: Disco Mensaje
1984: Katy La Oruga
1985: Fiebre de amor
1985: Keiko
1988: Escápate Conmigo

Filmography

Films
{|  class="wikitable"
|-
!  Year
!  Film
!  Role
!  Notes
|-
|1983
|Coqueta
|Rocío
|
|-
|1984
|Delincuente
|Cecilia Suárez
|
|-
|1985
|Fiebre de amor
| rowspan="2" |Lucerito
|Diosa de Plata Award for Breakthrough Performance Female
|-
|1988
|Escápate Conmigo
|
|-
|1989
|Quisiera Ser Hombre
|Manuela/Manuel
|
|-
|1990
|Deliciosa Sinvergüenza
|Lucero
|
|-
|1998
|Mulan 1998 film’’
|Reflection song (Spanish Version)
|
|-
|1999
|Tarzan|Jane
|voice (Spanish dubbing)
|-
|2004
|Zapata: El sueño de un héroe|Esperanza
|Nominated – MTV Movie Awards Mexico for Most Bizarre Sex
|}

Soap operas (telenovelas)

Notes
A  Lucero received three awards for her performances as the main heroines "María Guadalupe" and "María Fernanda" and as the main villain "María Paula".

Television shows

Theatre credits

Awards and nominations

Billboard Latin Music Awards
The Billboard Latin Music Awards are awarded annually by Billboard magazine in the United States. Lucero has received one nomination.

Billboard Mexican Music Awards
The Billboard Mexican Music Awards are awarded annually by Billboard'' magazine in the United States. Lucero has received three nominations.

References

External links

 
 [ Lucero] at Billboard.com
 [ Lucero] at Allmusic
 Lucero at Yahoo! Music Radio
 

1969 births
Living people
Actresses from Mexico City
Fonovisa Records artists
Latin pop singers
Mexican child actresses
Mexican film actresses
Mexican people of Spanish descent
Mexican people of Spanish-Jewish descent
Mexican stage actresses
Mexican telenovela actresses
Mexican television presenters
Mexican voice actresses
Mexican women singers
Mexican women television presenters
Portuguese-language singers of Mexico
Singers from Mexico City
Universal Music Latin Entertainment artists
Women in Latin music